Cedric Smith (born 1925) is an England international lawn bowler.

Bowls career
Smith was from Hertfordshire. He made his international debut in 1956 and competed in the first World Bowls Championship in Kyeemagh, New South Wales, Australia in 1966  and won a bronze medal in the pairs with the legendary David Bryant at the event. He also won a bronze medal in the team event (Leonard Trophy).

In 1970, Smith emigrated to Sydney, Australia, where he became a bowls commentator for ABC TV.

References

1925 births
Possibly living people
English male bowls players